Ola is an urban locality (an urban-type settlement) and the administrative center of Olsky District of Magadan Oblast, Russia, located on the Ola River on the shore of the Sea of Okhotsk,  east of Magadan. Population:

History
It was first mentioned in 1716.

References

External links
Information about Ola 

Urban-type settlements in Magadan Oblast